This is a list of current and former automobiles produced by Chinese automaker Guangzhou Automobile Corporation (abbreviated as GAC), along with those produced and imported under joint ventures with Fiat Chrysler Automobiles, Honda, Mitsubishi Motors, Nio, and Toyota.

GAC brands

Aion

Current Aion vehicles

Gonow

Former Gonow vehicles

Trumpchi

Current Trumpchi vehicles

Former Trumpchi vehicles

Joint ventures with foreign automakers

GAC Fiat Chrysler

Current Jeep vehicles

Former Fiat vehicles

Rebadged GAC vehicles 
 Fiat Yuejie (2019–present)

Current import vehicles 
Chrysler 300 (2011–present)
Chrysler Grand Voyager (2017–present)
Dodge JCUV (2009–present)
Fiat 500 (2011–present)
Jeep Grand Cherokee (2012–present)
Jeep Wrangler (2007–present)
Jeep Wrangler Unlimited (2007–present)

Former import vehicles 
Fiat Freemont (2011–2016)
Jeep Compass (2007-2017 (replaced by locally produced Compass))
Jeep Patriot (2007–2017)

GAC Honda

Current Acura vehicles

Current Everus vehicles

Former Everus vehicles

Current Honda vehicles

Former Honda vehicles

Rebadged GAC vehicles 
Everus Shirui (2018–present)

Current import vehicles 
Acura MDX 2007–present
Acura NSX 2016–present
Acura RDX 2012–present

GAC Mitsubishi

Current Mitsubishi vehicles

Rebadged GAC vehicles 
Mitsubishi E-More (2019–present)

Current import vehicles 
Mitsubishi Pajero

GAC-NIO

Current Hycan vehicles

GAC Toyota

Former Leahead vehicles

Current Toyota vehicles

Former Toyota vehicles

Rebadged GAC vehicles 
Leahead iA5 2019–present
Leahead iX4 2018–present

Current import vehicles 
Lexus CT (2011–present)
Lexus ES (1992–present)
Lexus GS (1993–present)
Lexus GX (2003–present)
Lexus IS (1999–present)
Lexus LM (2020–present)
Lexus LC (2017–present)
Lexus LS (1989–present (originally limited))
Lexus LX (1998–present)
Lexus NX (2014–present)
Lexus RC (2015–present)
Lexus RX (2003–present)
Lexus UX (2019–present)
Toyota Alphard (2010–present)

Former import vehicles 
Lexus SC (1991–2000)
Toyota FJ Cruiser (2007–2013)

References

GAC Group